Otdelny (also known as Otdelniy) is a shield volcano located in the southern part of Kamchatka Peninsula, Russia, east of the Savan River.

See also
 List of volcanoes in Russia

References 
 

Volcanoes of the Kamchatka Peninsula
Shield volcanoes of Russia
Holocene shield volcanoes
Holocene Asia